The 1920 United States presidential election in Maine took place on November 2, 1920, as part of the 1920 United States presidential election which was held throughout all contemporary 48 states. Voters chose six representatives, or electors to the Electoral College, who voted for president and vice president. 

Maine voted for Republican nominee, Senator Warren G. Harding of Ohio, over the Democratic nominee, Governor James M. Cox of Ohio. Harding ran with Governor Calvin Coolidge of Massachusetts, while Cox ran with Assistant Secretary of the Navy Franklin D. Roosevelt of New York. 

Harding won Maine by a margin of 39.12%. His victory in the New England states was helped in by the local popularity of his running mate, Calvin Coolidge, a traditional New England Yankee born in the small-town of Plymouth Notch, Vermont, who had started his political career nearby as Governor of Massachusetts. Harding's 88.48% of the vote that he received in Aroostook County is the best ever performance for any candidate in any county in Maine.

Results

Results by county

See also
 United States presidential elections in Maine

References

Maine
1920
1920 Maine elections